Kirandul–Visakhapatnam Express is an Express train belonging to the South Coast Railway zone of Indian Railways that run between  and  in India.

History
The line was inaugurated on 3 April 2017, as a seasonal line: Jagdalpur–Visakhapatnam special train (No. 08511/12). Until late 2017, this service was popular, with Piyush Goyal (Minister of Railways) approving a special train to Kirandul. On 21 November 2017, the train was extended to Kirandul, which is important for the South Chhattisgarh and Coastal Andhra Pradesh.

After 15 August 2018, this Special train was converted into an Express train numbered 18513 / 14. It became the second train running the Kirandul and Visakhapatnam corridor.

Service
The frequency of this train is daily. It covers the distance of 471 km with an average speed of 38 km/hr.

Routes
Route for Kirandul - Visakhapatnam express is as below:

Coaches
The train hauled with LBH rake coaches and also with two Vistadome coaches at the end of the train for the tourists to enjoy the beautiful journey till Araku.

Traction
As this route is electrified, Lallaguda/Visakhapatnam WAP 7 based locomotive pulls the train.

References

External links 

 18513 Kirandul – Visakhapatnam Express
 18514 Visakhapatnam – Kirandul Express

Rail transport in Chhattisgarh
Rail transport in Odisha
Rail transport in Andhra Pradesh
Railway services introduced in 2017
Transport in Visakhapatnam
Express trains in India